Hibrildes norax is a moth in the family Eupterotidae. It was described by Druce in 1888. It is found in the Democratic Republic of Congo (Katanga), Guinea, Malawi, Zambia and Zimbabwe.

Adults are semihyaline, the fore- and hindwings uniformly covered with yellowish-white scales, with all the veins light brown.

References

Moths described in 1888
Hibrildinae